The Afghan National Security Forces (ANSF), also known as the Afghan National Defense and Security Forces (ANDSF), were the military and internal security forces of the Islamic Republic of Afghanistan.

Structure 
The Afghan National Security Forces consisted of:
 Ministry of Defence
 Afghan National Army (ANA)
 ANA Special Operations Command
 Special Mission Wing (SMW)
 Afghan Border Force (ABF)
 Afghan National Civil Order Force (ANCOF)
 Afghan Air Force (AAF)
 Ministry of Interior Affairs
 Afghan National Police (ANP)
 Afghan Uniformed Police (AUP)
 Public Security Police (PSP)
 Afghan Border Police (ABP)
 General Directorate for Intelligence and Counter Crime (GDICC) (formerly Afghan Anti-Crime Police (AACP))
 Afghan Public Protection Force (APPF)
 Counter Narcotics Police of Afghanistan (CNPA)
 Afghan Local Police (ALP)
 General Command of Police Special Units (GCPSU)
 Afghan Territorial Force (ATF) 444
 Crisis Response Unit (CRU) 222
 Commando Force (CF) 333

NATO special operations forces trained, advised and assisted the ANASOC, SMW and GCPSU who were collectively known as the Afghan Special Security Forces (ASSF). The ASSF was described as the "ANDSF’s primary offensive forces".

The National Directorate of Security (NDS) was the state intelligence and security service and was part of the ANSF. The NDS reported directly to the Office of President.

See also 

 Military of Afghanistan
 Law enforcement in Afghanistan

References

Bibliography

Further reading

External links 
 Afghan National Security Forces (ANSF), Media Backgrounder,  NATO, October 2013

.
2000s in Afghanistan
2010s in Afghanistan
2020s in Afghanistan
2000s establishments in Afghanistan
2021 disestablishments in Afghanistan
War in Afghanistan (2001–2021)
Military history of Afghanistan